Project Connect (listed as Proposition A on the General Election ballot) is a transit expansion program by the Capital Metropolitan Transportation Authority (Capital Metro) in Austin, Texas, U.S. The program was approved by voters on November 3, 2020, in a local election concurrent with the 2020 presidential election.

The project is estimated to cost $7.1 billion and will be funded with public funds, both federally and locally through increasing the local property tax rate by 8.75 cents. This is a smaller-scale version of the proposal, originally estimated at about $10 billion, but ultimately downsized to $7.1 billion due to cost concerns amidst the COVID-19 pandemic.

Plan elements 

As a part of the plan, Capital Metro would add two light rail lines, three bus rapid transit lines, and one commuter rail line to the already existing Red Line, which will also undergo major improvements. The proposal also calls for general investments to all routes, a transit tunnel through the downtown area, a fully-electric bus and train fleet, and new park and ride areas throughout the service area.

MetroRail Blue Line 

The Blue Line would operate on a  stretch of light rail with 20 stations, running through downtown from Austin-Bergstrom International Airport, providing service along East Riverside Drive, then travel across Lady Bird Lake to the Austin Convention Center and west on 4th Street to Republic Square (the city's central transportation hub). The line continues north along Guadalupe Street to U.S. 183 and North Lamar Boulevard. The Blue Line will provide key service to the Texas State Capitol complex and The University of Texas at Austin campus. The blue line will run at a frequency of every 10 minutes, but that frequency can be increased for special events if needed. On parts of the route where two light rail lines share the same tracks, trains will arrive every 5 minutes.

MetroRail Orange Line 

The Orange Line will share most of its route with the Blue Line as it passes through downtown. The orange line will run at a frequency of every 10 minutes, but that frequency can be increased for special events if needed.

MetroRail Green Line 

The MetroRail Green Line is a proposed  corridor traveling from downtown Austin to eastern Travis County and into Bastrop County, connecting Manor, Texas with downtown Austin by commuter rail. With new transit hubs and Park & Rides, the Green Line would operate along Capital Metro’s existing freight line between Austin and Manor, with a possible future terminus at Elgin, connecting suburban residents to central Austin. The Green Line would interline with the Red Line between Downtown and Plaza Saltillo stations, where it will then split off, with the Red Line heading north and the Green Line heading east.

MetroRail Gold Line 

The revised proposal would build the Gold Line first as a MetroRapid bus service. The system plan, however, envisions the Gold Line as light rail that would operate for approximately  connecting 15 stations from Austin Community College's Highland campus along Airport Boulevard and Red River Street into downtown, across the river and through SoCo (South Congress), a popular neighborhood south of the Colorado River. Along its route, the Gold Line would service UT Austin's main campus to the east, easing access to sports events, given the line's close proximity to Darrell K Royal-Texas Memorial Stadium and new Moody Center.

MetroRail Red Line infill and improvement
Capital Metro's Red Line is a commuter rail service linking downtown Austin to residential neighborhoods in East Austin, the Domain, Research Park, Cedar Park, and Leander. Currently under construction is the future Downtown station, which will connect commuters with the downtown area, giving commuters and visitors direct access to the Austin Convention Center. Multiple upgrades to the red line are proposed by Project Connect. Two new stations are being planned, at McKalla place (adjacent to the new Austin FC soccer stadium), and at the Broadmoor development. These new stations would replace the existing Kramer Station. The installation of Positive Train Control was completed in August 2020. Additionally, once the new Downtown station is complete, the red line will run every 15 minutes, doubling its current frequency and capacity. If Project Connect is built out to its full plan in the future, the red line will be electrified, and station platforms will be extended to accommodate 2-unit trains.

Downtown Transit Tunnel 

Project Connect proposes a  transit tunnel underneath the Downtown area, which would serve the Orange, Blue, and (eventually) Gold light rail lines. The tunnel would run under Guadalupe street from Cesar Chavez street to at least 14th street, as well as under 4th street from Guadalupe to Trinity street. If the project is eventually built out to its full plan, another tunnel would be dug under Trinity street from Cesar Chavez street to 14th street to serve the gold line. The plan proposes multiple underground stations for the light rail lines, at locations including Republic Square, Downtown Station, Government Center, Trinity, and Capitol East. The underground stations will vary in size, with Republic Square or Downtown Station being the largest, and all other stations being smaller. Large stations such as Republic Square will have 3 levels/floors (sorted from shallowest to deepest): A level containing a food court, mezzanine with a performance stage for local music, and pedestrian tunnels to provide access to other buildings in Downtown, a middle level containing small shops and restaurants, public restrooms, and seating, and the deepest level containing the platform for boarding trains. All underground stations will be fully climate-controlled, and will utilize technologies such as platform screen doors on the platform level to assist with climate control and enhance passenger safety.

By 2021, planners were considering moving the Orange Line's southern portal to near Lively Middle School at Leland Street, citing engineering challenges with emerging close to Lady Bird Lake and the topography of South Congress.

MetroRapid and MetroExpress expansion 
Currently, Capital Metro operates two bus rapid transit routes (801 and 803) branded as Capital MetroRapid. Under Project Connect, seven new lines are proposed as enhanced or potential future service throughout Austin. In addition to connecting different transit services, these lines mostly feature a park and ride at their terminus for commuters. Project Connect also proposes four new MetroExpress commuter bus lines, as well as extended service to existing lines.

Electric fleet 
As part of the Project Connect plan, Capital Metro envisions a fully-electric bus and train fleet. The goal is to completely electrify the fleet of around 400 buses and trains by 2040, and the agency has already purchased 12 electric buses. In 2018, 3 bus manufacturers, Proterra, New Flyer, and BYD, lent electric test buses to Capital Metro for a pilot testing program. The agency ultimately chose Proterra for the purchase of their first 2 electric buses, later increasing that number to 6 buses. The first 2 Proterra buses arrived in late 2019, and the next 4 arrived in the summer of 2020. In 2019, Capital Metro approved a contract with New Flyer for the purchase of 6 Xcelsior electric buses. The order includes four 40-foot and two 60-foot buses, and these buses were delivered in the summer of 2020. The agency chose New Flyer for the second order of buses because they offered the 60-foot option, which Proterra does not offer. Capital Metro also chose to buy from two different manufacturers to help compare the performance of each company's buses and inform decisions on larger contracts in the future.

Capital Metro broke ground in 2019 on a new electric bus charging facility at their North Operations yard on Burnet Road. The facility will have the capacity to charge and maintain 200 electric buses, and will be highly automated.

The orange, blue, and gold light rail lines will run on electricity, unlike the current red line, which uses diesel-electric trains. CapMetro is looking into various options for powering the light rail vehicles, such as a traditional catenary system, using battery-powered trains with quick-charging technology at stations (such as Kinkisharyo's e-Brid technology), and Alstom's APS Ground-Level Power Supply system. The existing red line will also be electrified.

Neighborhood circulators 
Neighborhood circulator buses will connect transit areas to the surrounding community. According to the proposal, there will be 15 new neighborhood zones for this first/last mile connection service.

MetroBike 
For last mile connections, Capital Metro proposes an electric bike fleet at transit hubs as well as rental/payment integration in the CapMetro mobile application.

Park and Rides 

In addition to new services, Capital Metro is also proposing nine new park and rides throughout the region.

References 

Capital Metro
Proposed public transportation in Texas
Rail transportation in Austin, Texas
Transportation ballot measures in the United States
2020 ballot measures